The Little Rock to Cantonment Gibson Road-Old Wire Road Segment is a historic road section in Conway County, Arkansas. It is defined in part by the cut through which it passes, with steep banks on either side. Built in 1827, it is one of the oldest surviving road alignments of the military road built between Little Rock, and what is now Fort Gibson in Oklahoma. This route formed part of the Trail of Tears, the historic removal of Native Americans to the Indian Territory that is now Oklahoma.

The road section was listed on the National Register of Historic Places in 2008.

See also
National Register of Historic Places listings in Conway County, Arkansas

References

National Register of Historic Places in Conway County, Arkansas
Buildings and structures completed in 1827
1827 establishments in Arkansas Territory